Wunderbar is the eighth studio album by Australian punk rock band The Living End, released on 28 September 2018. It was produced by Tobias Kuhn and is the band's first album recorded in Europe.

Composition and recording
In September 2017, the band decided to write and record a new album quickly to push themselves out of their comfort zone. They booked pre-production and recording sessions for January 2018 in Berlin during winter, giving themselves less than four months to write an entire album of new material. Frontman Chris Cheney said: "We had limited time to write, which we were freaked out by at first. But it turned into a good thing because it meant full steam ahead."

Many of the songs on Wunderbar tackle political issues—"Death of the American Dream" concerns social politics and "Not Like the Other Boys" takes on discrimination.

Track listing

Personnel

Band
 Chris Cheney – vocals, guitar
 Scott Owen – double bass, backing vocals
 Andy Strachan – drums, backing vocals

Additional musicians
Die Toten Hosen – backing vocals

Production
 Tobias Kuhn – producer
 Jonas Holle – assistant engineer
 Moritz Enders – mixing at Tritonus Studio, Berlin
 Fabricus Clavée – mix assistant
 Kai Blankenberg - mastering at Skyline Tonfabrik, Düsseldorf

Artwork
 Alan Ashcraft – art direction, layout
 Tracy Gilbert – photography

Charts

References

2018 albums
The Living End albums